The following is a list of Verticordia species accepted by the Australian Plant Census as at December 2020:

Verticordia acerosa Lindl.
Verticordia aereiflora Eliz.George & A.S.George
Verticordia albida A.S.George
Verticordia amphigia A.S.George – pixie ears
Verticordia apecta Eliz.George & A.S.George – scruffy verticordia, Hay River featherflower
Verticordia argentea A.S.George
Verticordia attenuata A.S.George
Verticordia aurea A.S.George - buttercups
Verticordia auriculata A.S.George
Verticordia bifimbriata A.S.George
Verticordia blepharophylla A.S.George
Verticordia brachypoda Turcz.
Verticordia brevifolia A.S.George
Verticordia brownii (Desf.) DC. –  pink brownii, pink cauliflower
Verticordia capillaris A.S.George – cauliflower bush
Verticordia carinata Turcz. – pea-shaped featherflower, Stirling Range featherflower,
Verticordia centipeda A.S.George
Verticordia chrysantha Endl. – yellow featherflower, yellow Morrison
Verticordia chrysanthella A.S.George – little chrysantha
Verticordia chrysostachys Meisn.
Verticordia citrella A.S.George
Verticordia comosa A.S.George
Verticordia cooloomia A.S.George - Cooloomia verticordia
Verticordia coronata A.S.George
Verticordia crebra A.S.George – Barrens featherflower, crowded featherflower, Twertup featherflower
Verticordia cunninghamii Schauer – tree featherflower, liandu
Verticordia dasystylis A.S.George
Verticordia decussata S.T.Blake ex Byrnes
Verticordia densiflora Lindl. – compacted featherflower
Verticordia dichroma A.S.George
Verticordia drummondii Schauer – Drummond's featherflower
Verticordia endlicheriana Schauer
Verticordia eriocephala A.S.George – common cauliflower, lambswool, native cauliflower, wild cauliflower
Verticordia etheliana C.A.Gardner
Verticordia fastigiata Turcz. – mouse featherflower
Verticordia fimbrilepis Turcz. – shy featherflower
Verticordia forrestii F.Muell. – Forrest's featherflower
Verticordia fragrans A.S.George – hollyhock verticordia
Verticordia galeata A.S.George
Verticordia gracilis A.S.George
Verticordia grandiflora Endl. – claw featherflower, clawed featherflower, horned featherflower
Verticordia grandis Drumm. – scarlet featherflower
Verticordia habrantha Schauer – hidden featherflower
Verticordia halophila' A.S.George' – salt-loving featherflower, salt-loving verticordiaVerticordia harveyi Benth. – autumn featherflowerVerticordia helichrysantha F.Muell. ex Benth. – coast featherflowerVerticordia helmsii S.MooreVerticordia huegelii Endl. – variegated featherflowerVerticordia hughanii F.Muell. – Hughan's featherflowerVerticordia humilis Benth. – small featherflowerVerticordia inclusa A.S.GeorgeVerticordia insignis Endl.Verticordia integra A.S.George – plastic verticordiaVerticordia interioris C.A.Gardner ex A.S.GeorgeVerticordia jamiesonii F.Muell.Verticordia laciniata A.S.George Verticordia lehmannii SchauerVerticordia lepidophylla F.Muell.Verticordia lindleyi SchauerVerticordia longistylis A.S.George – blue spruce verticordiaVerticordia luteola A.S.GeorgeVerticordia minutiflora F.Muell.Verticordia mirabilis Eliz.George & A.S.GeorgeVerticordia mitchelliana C.A.Gardner – rapier featherflowerVerticordia mitodes A.S.GeorgeVerticordia monadelpha Turcz. – pink Morrison, woolly featherflower, pink or white woolly featherflower, pink cauliflowerVerticordia muelleriana E.Pritz.Verticordia multiflora Turcz.Verticordia nitens (Lindl.) Endl. – Christmas Morrison, glistening Morrison, Morrison, Morrison featherflower, Morrison-flower, orange Morrison, yellow Morrison, kodjeningara, kotyeningaraVerticordia nobilis Meisn. – northern grandifloraVerticordia oculata Meisn.Verticordia ovalifolia Meisn. – oval-leaved featherflowerVerticordia oxylepis Turcz. – bonsai featherflowerVerticordia paludosa A.S.GeorgeVerticordia patens A.S.GeorgeVerticordia penicillaris F.Muell.Verticordia pennigera Endl. – native teaVerticordia pholidophylla F.Muell.Verticordia picta Endl. – china cups, painted featherflowerVerticordia pityrhops A.S.George – east Mt Barren featherflower, pine-like featherflower, little pine verticordiaVerticordia plumosa (Desf.) Druce – plumed featherflower, Mundijong featherflower, vasse featherflowerVerticordia polytricha Benth. – northern cauliflowerVerticordia pritzeliiDiels – Pritzel's featherflowerVerticordia pulchella A.S.GeorgeVerticordia rennieana F.Muell. & TateVerticordia roei Endl. – Roe's featherflowerVerticordia rutilastra A.S.George – little grandifloraVerticordia serotina A.S.GeorgeVerticordia serrata (Lindl.) SchauerVerticordia setacea A.S.GeorgeVerticordia sieberi Diesing ex SchauerVerticordia spicata F.Muell. – spiked featherflowerVerticordia staminosa C.A.Gardner & A.S.GeorgeVerticordia stenopetala DielsVerticordia subulata A.S.GeorgeVerticordia tumida A.S.George – summer featherflowerVerticordia venusta A.S.GeorgeVerticordia verticillata Byrnes – tropical featherflower, whorled-leaved featherflowerVerticordia verticordina (F.Muell.) A.S.GeorgeVerticordia vicinella A.S.GeorgeVerticordia wonganensis A.S.GeorgeVerticordia x eurardyensis'' Eliz.George & A.S.George – Eurardy magenta

Notable revisions
The genus Verticordia underwent a revision by Alex George in 1991.

References

External links

.List of species
Verticordia
Verticordia species
Verticordia 02
Verticordia 02
Verticordia